Kjersti Elizabeth Grini (born 9 September 1971, in Oslo) is a Norwegian former handball player.

She played in the clubs Jaren, Lunner, Bækkelaget, Toten and Ikast. She has played in 201 games for the Norwegian National team, scoring 1003 goals.

In 2022 Grini was a participant of The Farm Celebrity, a reality show on TV 2, where she reached the final week.

References

1971 births
Living people
People from Gran, Norway
Norwegian female handball players
Norwegian expatriate sportspeople in Denmark
Expatriate handball players
Olympic handball players of Norway
Olympic bronze medalists for Norway
Handball players at the 1996 Summer Olympics
Handball players at the 2000 Summer Olympics
Olympic medalists in handball
Medalists at the 2000 Summer Olympics
Sportspeople from Innlandet